The 2017 Tennessee State Tigers football team represented Tennessee State University as a member of the Ohio Valley Conference (OVC) in the 2017 NCAA Division I FCS football season. They were led by eighth-year head coach Rod Reed and played their home games at Nissan Stadium and Hale Stadium. Tennessee State finished the season 6–5 overall and 2–5 in OVC play to tie for seventh place.

Schedule

Game summaries

at Georgia State

vs Jackson State

vs Florida A&M

at UT Martin

Eastern Illinois

at Eastern Kentucky

Austin Peay

at Tennessee Tech

Virginia–Lynchburg

Southeast Missouri State

at Jacksonville State

Ranking movements

References

Tennessee State
Tennessee State Tigers football seasons
Tennessee State Tigers football